The 1977 NCAA Men's Division I Swimming and Diving Championships were contested in March 1977 at the Cleveland State University Natatorium at Cleveland State University in Cleveland, Ohio at the 54th annual NCAA-sanctioned swim meet to determine the team and individual national champions of Division I men's collegiate swimming and diving in the United States. 

USC once again topped the team standings, the Trojans' fourth consecutive title and ninth overall.

Team standings
Note: Top 10 only
(H) = Hosts
(DC) = Defending champions
Full results

See also
List of college swimming and diving teams
The 1977 NCAA Division I Championships were notable for setting new NCAA Records in every event.  Actually, records were broken in 16 of the 15 swimming events, because the 1,000 yd Freestyle record was broken on the way in the 1,650 yd Freestyle.  This rewriting of the entire record book is believed to be a unique situation.

References

NCAA Division I Men's Swimming and Diving Championships
NCAA Division I Swimming And Diving Championships
NCAA Division I Swimming And Diving Championships